The Mysterious Class (Korean: 남고괴담; RR: Namgogoedam;  "Ghost Story in a Boys' School") is a 2021 South Korean web series featuring an ensemble cast consisting of the members of boy band Treasure—Choi Hyun-suk, Park Ji-hoon, Yoshinori Kanemoto, Kim Jun-kyu, Yoon Jae-hyuk,  Asahi Hamada, Kim Do-young, Haruto Watanabe, Park Jeong-woo and So Jung-hwan—and their former co-members Mashiho Takata and Bang Ye-dam. Its plot centers on a group of 12th grade students in a boys' school who try to solve the mystery of their class' resident ghost.

The series aired for free viewing every Friday 22:00 KST on the band's official YouTube channel from 12 November to 31 December 2021. A short "cookie video" for each episode, serving as post-credits scenes or supplemental points to the story, was also uploaded for paid subscription in the band's Weverse account a day after its corresponding episode's airing date. It served as Treasure's first full-fledge endeavor in acting after the band made its acting debut through the short film It's Okay, That's Friendship that was broadcast on 5 March 2021 as the 36th episode of their variety web series Treasure Map.

Synopsis 
In Boseok Boys High School, the students of Grade 12 – Class 4 are trying to come into terms with the possibility of a ghost lurking in their homeroom after discovering that their class of 21 students was supposed to have only 20. A series of spooky events drove the students to suspect each other while trying to solve the mystery of their class' resident ghost, who might simply be posing as one of their classmates.

Cast

Main 
The roles of the main characters of the series are played by members of the boy band Treasure, including their two former co-members:
 Haruto Watanabe as Haruto
 the resident ghost and former student of Grade 12 – Class 4 in Boseok Boys' High School; the late son of the school guard, Jae-hyuk's sole dorm roommate and Mr. Ha Dong-min's former classmate. Ten years prior to the events of the story, Haruto was a sickly student that rarely went to class due to his illness which ultimately led to his death, becoming the resident ghost of Grade 12 – Class 4. Ten years later, he became visible to the class' present batch of students and to its present homeroom teacher Mr. Ha, becoming the 21st "student" in a class that is supposed to have 20 students only. Yearning to have a normal school life "even after death", Haruto is fond of taking care of his classmates and enjoys taking photos of them using his Polaroid camera. Soon, his true identity is at risk of being exposed when his new classmates start looking for their class' resident ghost and begin suspecting each other.
 Kim Do-young as Kim Do-young
 the class president of Grade 12 – Class 4 in Boseok Boys' High School; Hyun-suk and Jung-hwan's dorm roommate. Do-young has a strong sense of rivalry against his class' top student Jae-hyuk due to being pressured by his father to perform well in academics in order to be able to have his college studies abroad. He is determined to find out the identity of their class' resident ghost but only for the prospect of gaining their homeroom teacher's recommendation if he manages the class well as its class president.
 Choi Hyun-suk as Choi Hyun-suk
 a student of Grade 12 – Class 4 in Boseok Boys' High School; Do-young and Jung-hwan's dorm roommate. Hyun-suk is interested in the paranormal and partnered with Ye-dam in doing a late-night séance that apparently revealed to the class the existence of a ghost in their homeroom.
 Bang Ye-dam as Bang Ye-dam
 a student of Grade 12 – Class 4 in Boseok Boys' High School; Asahi, Yoshinori and Mashiho's dorm roommate; an aspiring K-pop artist. Ye-dam was Hyun-suk's partner in a séance; he later discovers that a music demo he is working on has apparently been tampered by their class' resident ghost.
 Asahi Hamada as Asahi
 a student of Grade 12 – Class 4 in Boseok Boys' High School; Ye-dam, Yoshinori and Mashiho's dorm roommate. A quiet and introverted student, Asahi is a skilled painter who was suspected to be the class' resident ghost after his classmates discover a strange painting in the art room.
 So Jung-hwan as So Jung-hwan
 a student of Grade 12 – Class 4 in Boseok Boys' High School; Do-young and Hyun-suk's dorm roommate; a YouTube vlogger. Jung-hwan enjoys filming vlogs, although his videos do not gain traction.
 Yoon Jae-hyuk as Yoon Jae-hyuk
 a student of Grade 12 – Class 4 in Boseok Boys' High School; Haruto's sole roommate. As a top student, Jae-hyuk is very keen to studying and sometimes treats his less studious classmates coldly.
 Yoshinori Kanemoto  as Yoshinori
 a student of Grade 12 – Class 4 in Boseok Boys' High School; Ye-dam, Asahi and Mashiho's dorm roommate. Yoshinori is into tarot card reading and doing magic tricks. He is the grandson of a mudang (female shaman).
 Park Jeong-woo as Park Jeong-woo
 a student of Grade 12 – Class 4 in Boseok Boys' High School; Jun-kyu and Ji-hoon's dorm roommate. Jeong-woo is an athletic boy who likes sports but is known to be a scaredy-cat among his classmates.
 Kim Jun-kyu as Kim Jun-kyu
 a student of Grade 12 – Class 4 in Boseok Boys' High School; Jeong-woo and Ji-hoon's dorm roommate. Jun-kyu has a bright and outgoing personality, and is a doting lover to his girlfriend.
 Park Ji-hoon as Park Ji-hoon
 a student of Grade 12 – Class 4 in Boseok Boys' High School; Jeong-woo and Jun-kyu's dorm roommate. Ji-hoon is a prankster who likes to scare his classmates.
 Mashiho Takata as Mashiho
 a student of Grade 12 – Class 4 in Boseok Boys' High School; Ye-dam, Asahi and Yoshinori's dorm roommate. Mashiho is a punctual student who regularly drinks milk for his growth plates.

Supporting 

 Jang Tae-hoon as Ha Dong-min
 the homeroom teacher of Grade 12 – Class 4 and an alumnus of Boseok Boys' High School; Haruto's former classmate. Mr. Ha was caught in an accident while working overtime coincidentally on the night his students, led by Hyun-suk and Ye-dam, did a séance. He trusted Do-young with the responsibility of managing the homeroom, promising him support in his overseas college career if he manages the class well. He is revealed to be a classmate of the late Haruto ten years prior to the events of the story.
 Lee Kyung-min as Hong Sung-joon
 a Grade 12 student in Boseok Boys' High School; Won-jin's classmate and an acquaintance of the students of Grade 12 – Class 4.
 Chae Hee-soo as Son Won-jin
 a Grade 12 student in Boseok Boys' High School; Sung-joon's classmate and an acquaintance of the students of Grade 12 – Class 4.
 Seo Ye-ri as Lee Min-jung
 a music teacher at Boseok Boys' High School.
 Kim Hong-boo as Jung Geun-yong
 a teacher at Boseok Boys' High School; Mr. Ha Dong-min and Haruto's former homeroom teacher. Mr. Jung is the teacher in charge of the school's milk rations. He is Mr. Ha's predecessor as homeroom teacher of Grade 12 – Class 4.
 Han Myung-chul as Boseok Boys' High School's security guard
 a staff at Boseok Boys' High School; Haruto's father. Deeply brokenhearted by his son's death at a such young age, he hid the funerary urn that contains Haruto's remains inside Haruto's own locker in the Grade 12 – Class 4 classroom where Haruto's ghost has been lingering since then.

Others 
 Goo Shi-yeon as Jeong-woo's mother
 Goo Jae-yeon as Yoshinori's grandmother, a mudang (female shaman)

Episodes 
The following table contains the episodes of the series:

Soundtrack 
The soundtrack for The Mysterious Class consists of musical score composed by Baek Jong-sung et al. and the following two theme songs. Both of these theme songs are performed by Treasure and were released on 15 February 2022 through the CD version of the band's first extended play The Second Step: Chapter One.

A Christmas version of "BFF (Best Friends Forever)" was released earlier on 24 December 2021 through the band's official social media accounts.

Notelist

References

External links 
 Official website – Bamboo Network
 남고괴담 (The Mysterious Class) – full playlist in TREASURE (트레저) official YouTube channel
 PACKAGE: The Mysterious Class Behind Story – Weverse, paid subscription required
 

South Korean drama web series
2021 web series debuts
South Korean web series